Let Battle Commence is the third album by Italian heavy metal band Doomsword, released in 2003. In 2019, Metal Hammer ranked it as the 23rd best power metal album of all time.

Track listing

The lyrics concern the Great Heathen Army invasion of England in 865. 

The front cover is taken from the painting "Gizur and the Huns"(1886) by Peter Nicolai Arbo.

References 

2003 albums
Doomsword albums